Gothersgade 29 is a property with roots back to the late 17th century, but later increased in height twice and with a facade design dating from 1865, situated in Gothersgade, opposite Borgergade, in the Old Town of Copenhagen, Denmark. The building fronting the street is via a staircase on the rear attached to a half-timbered rear wing from before 1710. The complex was listed in the Danish registry of protected buildings and places in 1981.

History

18th century

In the late 18th century, the site was part of a larger property. It was listed as No. 125 in Købmager Quarter in 1689, owned by Nikolaj Boye. The property was later divided into three smaller properties (now Gothersgade 27–31). In the new cadastre of 1756, the central of the three properties was listed as No. 142. It was owned at the time by lead-roofer Gabriel Daniel Petersen.

At the time of the 1787 census, No.142 was home to three households. Christian Simonsen, a glazier, resided in the building with three employees (two of them apprentices), a housekeeper and a lodger. Peder Horning, an auctioner, resided in the building with his wife Anne Cathrine, a maid and two lodgers.

19th century
At the time of the 1801 census, No. 142 was home to two households. Friderich Greiter, a master shoemaker, resided in the building with his two children (aged 13 and 16), a maid and seven employees (four shoemakers and three apprentices). Peter Petersen, a tailor, resided in the building with his wife Elisabeth Bay, their two sons (aged one and seven) and one maid.

In the new cadastre of 1806, the property was listed as No. 339. It was owned at that time by Christian Dahm.

At the time of the 1845 census, No. 339 was home to a total of 17 people.  Samuel Goldschmidt, a 36-year-old silk and textile merchant, resided on the ground floor with two employees (one of them an apprentice). Hendrike Reb. Svarmarken, a widow working with needlework, resided on the first floor with two foster daughters (aged seven and 15). Willadssine Cathrine Arvesen, a 53-year-old widow with a royal pension, was also residing on the first floor. Sara Kalisch, a 70-year-old widow, resided on the second floor with her 29-year-old daughter Sara Rose Kalisch. Another eight tenants, mostly unmarried, resided on the third floor and in the garret.

Architecture
Gothersgade 29 was constructed as a two-storey half-timbered building sometime between 1677 and 1684, The facade was then crowned by a three-bay gabled wall dormer. The building was attached to a half-timbered rear wing (constructed before 1710) via a staircase at the rear. In 1765, the front wing and staircase were expanded by one storey and the facade was rebuilt in brick at the same time. In 1784, the rear side of the building was also rebuilt in brick on the two lower floors. From 1837 to 1848, the building was once again expanded by one floor. The facade was adapted to its current design in 1863. The plastered upper part of the facade is finished with shadow joints, a sill course below the windows on the first floor and a cornice. The entrance to the shop in the ground floor is flanked by fluted pilasters with capitals.

Today
The property was owned by Quisisana A/S as of 2008.

References

External links

 Source

Listed residential buildings in Copenhagen
Timber framed buildings in Copenhagen